The River Isbourne is 14 mile (22 km) long tributary of the River Avon which flows through Gloucestershire and Worcestershire in the Midlands of England.

Course
The source of the river is a series of springs that occur on the northern flank of Cleeve Hill, on the edge of the Cotswold Hills. These springs occur where the permeable Jurassic limestone, meets the impermeable Upper Lias mudstone and clays that underlie most of the Isbourne catchment.

The river flows from Cleeve Hill in a steep valley in a northerly direction through the hamlet of Postlip, before reaching the town of Winchcombe which it passes along its eastern side. Beyond the town, it continues northwards to Toddington, through the grounds of Toddington Manor, and then past the village of Wormington. The river then crosses into Worcestershire and is joined by the Laverton brook, before it reaches the village of Sedgeberrow. Flowing directly north the Isbourne passes through the village of Hinton on the Green, it then continues through an area of market gardens on the outskirts of Evesham, and passes under the Pershore road, before joining the River Avon near Hampton.

Catchment

Land use in the catchment is predominantly rural, with 80 percent made up from a mixture of arable, horticulture and pasture; the remainder being woodland, with a minor fraction of urbanised area of less than 2 percent.

In terms of geology, apart from the headwaters which are underlain by the Cotswold limestone, the majority of catchment is Lias clay. This impermeable clay means that Isbourne can become responsive in terms of runoff to heavy rainfall events.

Flooding

The Isbourne has a history of flooding along its course, especially in Sedgeberrow, the most recent occasion being in summer 2007.

References

Rivers of Gloucestershire
Rivers of Worcestershire
1Isbourne